The Giardino Botanico Trebbo Trebbi is a private botanical garden located at Via Ottaviano Montini, 119, Mompiano, Brescia, Province of Brescia, Lombardy, Italy.

See also 
 List of botanical gardens in Italy

References 
 Brescia Tourism (Italian)
 Trebbo Trebbi, Il giardino secondo natura e le piante erbacee perenni, Edagricole, 1993. . 

Botanical gardens in Italy
Province of Brescia
Gardens in Lombardy